Chincoteague Channel is a channel on the Eastern Shore of Virginia between marshlands to the northwest and Chincoteague Island to the southeast.  The Chincoteague Channel connects to Chincoteague Bay to the northeast and Chincoteague Inlet to the southwest.

Notes

Channels of the United States
Chincoteague, Virginia
Bodies of water of Accomack County, Virginia